Sele Davou (born 9 October 1996) is a Nigerian football midfielder who plays for São Martinho. He played on the Portuguese second tier for Oliveirense.

References

1996 births
Living people
Nigerian footballers
S.R. Almancilense players
F.C. Felgueiras 1932 players
CD Operário players
Sertanense F.C. players
C.D.C. Montalegre players
U.D. Oliveirense players
A.R. São Martinho players
Association football midfielders
Liga Portugal 2 players
Nigerian expatriate footballers
Expatriate footballers in Portugal
Nigerian expatriate sportspeople in Portugal
Sportspeople from Jos